Kester Berwick (1903–1992) was born in Adelaide and died an expatriate on Corfu in the Greek islands. Born Frank Perkins, he took the name Kester Baruch because a friend told him that would sound "less plebeian", then changed it again at the beginning of World War II when he was living in Switzerland. An Australian actor and writer, Berwick, who was gay, spent the final 23 years of his life in Greece. His life is the subject of one of the storylines in Robert Dessaix's novel Corfu.

Biography
Born Frank Perkins in Adelaide, South Australia, he changed his name to Kester Baruch after a friend told him that would sound "less plebeian", than changed it again to Kester Berwick at the beginning of World War II, when he was living in Switzerland. He founded the experimental Ab-Intra Studio Theatre in Adelaide with Alan Harkness in 1931. In 1935, the two men closed Ab-Intra and went to Europe. Berwick studied at Dartington Hall, Devon, England, with Michael Chekhov a former student of Stanislavski, for four years from 1936 to 1937. After World War II broke out he returned to Australia to spend this time teaching. In the 'forties he was involved in directing plays at The Hut, now part of the University of Adelaide Theatre Guild. He then taught for five years in London from 1955.

Berwick settled in Mithymna (Molyvos), on the island of Lesbos in 1960, later moving to Gastouri, Corfu in 1969 where he lived until his death at the age of 89 in 1992.

Plays and publications
 1932: directed with Alan Harkness, The Demon's Mask, at Ab-Intra
 1932: directed with Alan Harkness, The Robe of Yama with Thelma Thomas, at Ab-Intra
 1934: produced with Alan Harkness, Jacques Copeau's The House Into Which We Are Born and Jean-Jacques Bernard's Martine, at Ab-Intra
 1944: directed with Brian Elliott, Evening for Young Folk, a play at The Hut, Adelaide.
 1945: director, The Stronger, by August Strindberg.
 1946: director, Swirling, by Denys Amiel and André Obey.
 1948: director, The Rape of Lucrece, by André Obey.
His novel, Head of Orpheus Singing, was published in 1973.

References
Kester Berwick, Head of Orpheus Singing, Angus & Robertson, London, 1973.
Robert Dessaix, Corfu, Picador (Pan MacMillan), Australia, 2001.
Thelma Afford, "Ab-Intra Studio Theatre in Adelaide 1931-35", Australasian Drama Studies n. 12-13, pp. 167–180. Bundoora, Vic. : Theatre and Drama Program, La Trobe University.
Thelma Afford, "The Most Experimental Little Theatre", Dreamers and Visionaries: Adelaide's Little Theatres from the 1920s to the early 1940s pp. 45–72. Sydney: Currency Press.

External links
 http://www.adelaide.edu.au/theatreguild/past/

1903 births
1992 deaths
Australian male stage actors
Australian gay actors
Australian gay writers
Australian LGBT dramatists and playwrights
20th-century Australian male actors
Australian male dramatists and playwrights
20th-century Australian dramatists and playwrights
20th-century Australian male writers
20th-century LGBT people
Australian expatriates in Greece